Filingue is a town in southwestern Niger and is the capital city of Filingue Department.
It is situated on the eastern bank of the Dallol Bosso valley, some 180 km northeast of Niger's capital city Niamey.
As pools of stagnant water remain in this valley in the dry season there's a lot of mudbrick making.

Communes of Tillabéri Region
Tillabéri Region